Tino Edelmann (born 13 April 1985) is a retired German Nordic combined skier who has competed since 2001. He won a bronze medal in the 4 x 5 km team event at the 2010 Winter Olympics in Vancouver and six silver medals at the FIS Nordic World Ski Championships.

He has five World Cup victories, three individually and two in team.

References
 
 Official website 

1985 births
Living people
People from Annaberg-Buchholz
German male Nordic combined skiers
Nordic combined skiers at the 2010 Winter Olympics
Nordic combined skiers at the 2014 Winter Olympics
Olympic Nordic combined skiers of Germany
Olympic bronze medalists for Germany
Olympic medalists in Nordic combined
FIS Nordic World Ski Championships medalists in Nordic combined
Medalists at the 2010 Winter Olympics
Sportspeople from Saxony
21st-century German people